Samson is a 1961 Polish film directed by Andrzej Wajda that uses art house aesthetics to tell a story about the Holocaust. Wajda's World War II film alludes to the Old Testament story of Samson, who had supernatural physical strength. But unlike the Biblical character, Wajda's Samson has great emotional strength.

Plot
A dark coming-of-age film, Samson follows its Jewish protagonist (Serge Merlin) from an anti-Semitic private school to a prison, then into a Jewish ghetto, and finally over the ghetto wall to the outside world. Wajda uses this journey as a means to explore expressionist cinematography and the weighty issues facing the Jewish people.

The construction of the Jewish ghetto is communicated through a single, stationary shot. A shabbily dressed mass is clustered in front of the camera, and a pair of hands with a hammer and nails secures one board at a time, until the shot of people has been replaced with a shot of a wall. Through minimalism and simplicity, Wadja establishes a separation between the world of the impoverished Jew and the world outside the ghetto. The viewer looking on as the ghetto walls block the view of what happening inside, is made to feel detached from the horror inside.

One question Wajda raises is that of Jewish solidarity and the guilt of being saved while one's brethren are suffering. Samson escapes from the Jewish ghetto but immediately wants to return. Although he could enjoy a comfortable life of cocktails and women, he'd rather be in the ghetto, collecting corpses off the streets. Samson argues that his place is with the Jews, that he should suffer alongside them. A fake-blond beauty offers a different take. She confides to Samson that she's Jewish and has been concealing her roots in order to avoid the ghetto. Although she argues passionately, Samson's emotional strength inevitably inspires her to accept her fate as a Jew.

When Samson is bruised and exhausted, lying on the ground, he is encouraged by a close friend who says, "one man can suffer such blows and rise again." For Wajda, this is the greatness displayed in Jewish history. Samson is a scrawny, haggard young man, who says very little and might almost border on boringly average; but he has the ability to rise again despite any blow, proving his strength of spirit.

Production
Of Samson, Wajda wrote,

Reception
Georges Sadoul
"Les Lettres Françaises", Paris, 1964
"In its first part, the film is a masterpiece. Never before has Wajda revealed such virtuosity. He has not succumbed to the temptation of formal exercise. Far from any baroque mannerism, he says what he has to say firmly, even brutally, while using a minimum of effects, in shades nearly classical. This style present throughout the film reveals a great talent on the threshold of maturity."

Konrad Eberhardt
"Film", Warsaw, September 1961
No attempt has been made to discuss this new offer, so different from Wajda's previous works, in terms of creative, rather than propaganda merits, or the author's intentions and the values which the film contributes to our cinematography.

Cast
Serge Merlin ...  Jakub Gold 
Alina Janowska ...  Lucyna 
Elżbieta Kępińska ...  Kazia, Malina's Niece 
Jan Ciecierski ...  Józef Malina 
Tadeusz Bartosik ...  Pankrat 
Władysław Kowalski ...  Fialka 
Irena Netto ...  Jakub's Mother 
Beata Tyszkiewicz ...  Stasia 
Jan Ibel ...  Genio 
Bogumil Antczak ...  Prisoner 
Edmund Fetting ...  Guest at Lucyna's Party 
Roland Głowacki ...  Guest at Lucyna's Party 
Andrzej Herder ...  Gestapo Officer 
Zygmunt Hübner ...  Gestapo Officer 
Zofia Jamry ...  Woman Blackmailing Malina

Awards
Nominated for a Golden Lion in 1961 at the Venice Film Festival

See also
The Fifth Horseman is Fear

Notes

References

External links

 
The Academy's profile of Wajda

1961 films
1961 drama films
Polish avant-garde and experimental films
1960s coming-of-age drama films
Films based on the Hebrew Bible
Films about Jews and Judaism
Films directed by Andrzej Wajda
Polish black-and-white films
Films set in Poland
Holocaust films
1960s Polish-language films
Samson
1960s avant-garde and experimental films
Polish drama films